Medical desert is a term used to describe regions whose population has inadequate access to healthcare. The term can be applied whether the lack of healthcare is general or in a specific field, such as dental or pharmaceutical. It is primarily used to describe rural areas although it is sometimes applied to urban areas as well. The term is inspired by the analogous concept of a food desert.

United States 

An estimated 30 million Americans, many in rural regions of the country, live at least 60 minutes drive from a hospital with trauma care services. Limited access to emergency room services, as well as medical specialists, leads to increases in mortality rates and long-term health problems, such as heart disease and diabetes. Medicare, Medicaid, and uninsured patients are less likely than others to live within an hour's drive of a hospital emergency room.

Since 1975, over 1,000 hospitals, many in rural regions, have closed their doors because they are unable to bear the cost of care of uninsured patients. That has required some patients in every state to drive at least an hour to a hospital emergency room. The problem poses an even greater danger during the COVID-19 pandemic, when patients in respiratory distress urgently need oxygen and can ill afford an hour-long ambulance ride to reach a hospital. In addition to the immediate financial problems facing rural healthcare providers, inequities in rural healthcare are further aggravated by the disproportionately low number of newly-graduated doctors applying for positions in rural areas.

Although concentrated in rural regions, health care deserts also exist in urban and suburban areas, particularly in Black-majority census tracts in Chicago, Los Angeles, and New York City.  Medical literature addressing health disparities in urban centers has applied the term medical desert to areas that are more than five miles from the nearest acute care facility. Racial demographic disparities in healthcare access are also present in rural areas, particularly with Native Americans living in rural areas receiving inadequate medical care.

Pharmacy deserts have developed in some urban areas, a situation that has increased the challenge of distributing and administering vaccines for the COVID-19 pandemic.

See also

 Banking desert
Environmental racism
Fenceline community
Food desert
Ghetto tax
 Transit desert
 Underfunded public school system

References 

Health care